The 2006–07 Elitserien was the 73rd season of the top division of Swedish handball. 14 teams competed in the league. The eight highest placed teams qualified for the playoffs, whereas teams 11–12 had to play relegation playoffs against teams from the second division, and teams 13–14 were relegated automatically. Hammarby IF won the regular season and also won the playoffs to claim their second Swedish title.

League table

Playoffs bracket

References 

Swedish handball competitions